Paphinia benzingii is a species of orchid endemic to Esmeraldas Province of Ecuador.

The classification of this species was published by Calaway H. Dodson & Tilman Neudecker in Die Orchidee. Hamburg-Othmarschen & Hamburg, 41: 233, figs. 190. Paphinia benzingii is distributed through the Esmeraldas (Ecuador, Western South America, Southern America). It was originally collected in Ecuador at an altitude of about 750m.

References

External links 

benzingii
Endemic orchids of Ecuador
Flora of Esmeraldas Province